Crisostomo Ayson Yalung (born December 3, 1953) is a former Roman Catholic bishop from the Philippines. He was the second Bishop of Antipolo, serving from December 3, 2001, to October 19, 2002.

Early life and education
Born in Angeles City, Pampanga on December 3, 1953. Yalung studied philosophy and theology at San Carlos Seminary.

He holds a licentiate in Sacred Scriptures from the Pontifical Biblical Institute and a doctorate in Sacred Theology from the Pontifical Gregorian University in Rome. He would also attend the Fu Jen Catholic University where he learned to the Chinese language..

Career
Yalung was ordained as a priest for the Archdiocese of San Fernando on June 23, 1979.

Among Yalung's pastoral assignments were being assistant parish priest in Balibago, Angeles City (1979–1980) and formator at Mother of Good Counsel Seminary in San Fernando City, Pampanga (1987–1989). He served as Vice-Rector of the Lorenzo Mission Institute (1989-1991) and as Rector of San Carlos Seminary (1991–1994). He was made Papal Chaplain for the Archdiocese of Manila in 1991.

Pope John Paul II named him auxiliary bishop of Manila in March 23, 1994. Fondly known as Bishop Tom, he headed the Ecclesiastical District of Makati. Concurrently, he served as Parish Priest and Rector of the National Shrine and Parish of the Sacred Heart in San Antonio Village, Makati from 1999 to 2001.

On October 18, 2001, he was named successor to the Most Rev. Protacio Gungon as Bishop of Antipolo. He was installed on December 3 that same year. His tenure as bishop was marked by the major renovation of the Cathedral of Antipolo, under the rectorship of Rev. Fr. Enrico Salazar, the inauguration of Our Lady of Peace and Good Voyage Seminary, and the preparation of the diocese for the upcoming establishment of the neighboring Diocese of Pasig. Around more than 10 parishes (and quasi-parishes) were established during his episcopacy.

Yalung's term was interrupted when a scandal broke out. He was discovered to have fathered a child. The incident prompted him to resign on October 19, 2002. His resignation was accepted on December 5, 2002.

Post-resignation
After his resignation, the Vatican named the Most Rev. Jesse E. Mercado, D.D., former Auxiliary Bishop of Manila (now Bishop of Parañaque), to become the diocese's erstwhile apostolic administrator pending the appointment of a new bishop, which came on December 7, 2002, with Kalibo Bishop Gabriel V. Reyes' designation as the third Bishop of Antipolo.

Yalung would work as a librarian in the United States, where he fled following the scandal. He had a second daughter with his lover, who announced that Yalung would leave the clergy to attend to their children.

References 

Yalung, Crisostomo
Living people
People from Angeles City
1953 births